The Battle of Paris (a.k.a. The Gay Lady) is a 1929 American pre-Code musical film.

Plot
Gertrude Lawrence plays a singer in Paris during World War I. After stealing from Tony (Walter Petrie), an American artist, the two fall in love.

Cast
 Gertrude Lawrence - Georgie
 Charles Ruggles - Zizi
 Walter Petrie - Tony
 Gladys DuBois - Suzanne
 Arthur Treacher - Harry (film debut)
 Joe King - Jack
 Luis Alberni - (uncredited)

Songs
 "When I Am Housekeeping For You"
Words by Howard Dietz (as Dick Howard)
Music by Jay Gorney
Copyright 1929 by Spier and Coslow Inc

 "Here Comes The Bandwagon"
Words and Music by Cole Porter
Copyright 1929 by Harms Inc.

 "What Makes My Baby Blue"
Words by Howard Dietz (as Dick Howard)
Music by Jay Gorney
Copyright 1929 by Spier and Coslow Inc

 "They All Fall In Love"
Words and Music by Cole Porter 
Copyright 1929 by Harms Inc. 
Sung by Gertrude Lawrence

External links
 
 
 

1929 films
1929 musical films
Films directed by Robert Florey
Paramount Pictures films
American black-and-white films
American musical films
1920s American films
1920s English-language films
English-language musical films